Exoristinae is a subfamily of flies in the family Tachinidae.

Tribes & genera
Tribe Acemyini Brauer & von Bergenstamm, 1889
Acemya Robineau-Desvoidy, 1830
Atlantomyia Crosskey, 1977
Ceracia Rondani, 1865
Charitella Mesnil, 1957
Eoacemyia Townsend, 1926
Hygiella Mesnil, 1957
Metacemyia Herting, 1969
Tribe Anacamptomyiini
Anacamptomyia Bischof, 1904
Euvespivora Baranov, 1942
Isochaetina Mesnil, 1950
Koralliomyia Mesnil, 1950
Leucocarcelia Villeneuve, 1921
Parapales Mesnil, 1950
Tribe Blondeliini
Admontia Brauer & Bergenstamm, 1889
Afrolixa Curran, 1939
Angustia Sellers, 1943
Anisia Wulp, 1890
Anoxynops Townsend, 1927
Belida Robineau-Desvoidy, 1863
Biomeigenia Mesnil, 1961
Blondelia Robineau-Desvoidy, 1830
Calodexia van der Wulp
Calolydella Townsend, 1927
Celatoria Coquillett, 1890
Chaetonodexodes Townsend, 1916
Chaetostigmoptera Townsend, 1916
Compsilura Bouché, 1834
Compsiluroides Mesnil, 1953
Cryptomeigenia Brauer & von Bergenstamm, 1891
Dolichocoxys  Townsend, 1927
Dolichotarsina Mesnil, 1977
Dolichotarsus Brooks, 1945
Drinomyia Mesnil, 1962
Enrogalia Reinhard, 1964
Eophyllophila Townsend, 1926
Eribella Mesnil, 1960
Erynniola Mesnil, 1977
Erynniopsis Townsend, 1926
Eucelatoria Townsend, 1909
Euhalidaya Walton, 1914
Euthelyconychia Townsend, 1927
Gastrolepta Rondani, 1862
Hemimacquartia Brauer & Bergenstamm, 1893
Hygiella Mesnil, 1957
Istocheta Rondani, 1859
Leiophora Robineau-Desvoidy, 1863
Ligeria Robineau-Desvoidy, 1863
Ligeriella Mesnil, 1961
Lixophaga  Townsend, 1908
Medina Robineau-Desvoidy, 1830
Medinospila Mesnil, 1977
Meigenia Robineau-Desvoidy, 1830
Meigenielloides Townsend, 1919
Miamimyia Townsend, 1916
Myiopharus Brauer & von Bergenstamm, 1889
Opsomeigenia Townsend, 1919
Oswaldia Robineau-Desvoidy, 1863
Oxynops Townsend, 1912
Paracraspedothrix Villeneuve, 1919
Paratrixa Brauer & Bergenstamm, 1891
Paropsivora Malloch, 1934
Phasmophaga Townsend, 1909
Phyllophilopsis Townsend, 1915
Phytorophaga Bezzi, 1923
Picconia Robineau-Desvoidy, 1863
Policheta Rondani, 1856
Prodegeeria Brauer & Bergenstamm, 1895
Sphaerina Wulp, 1890
Steleoneura Stein, 1924
Thelairodoria Townsend, 1927
Trigonospila Pokorny, 1886
Urodexia Osten Sacken, 1882
Uromedina Townsend, 1926
Vibrissina Rondani, 1861
Zaira Robineau-Desvoidy, 1830
Tribe Eryciini
Acantholespesia Wood, 1987
Alsomyia Brauer & von Bergenstamm, 1891
Amelibaea Mesnil, 1955
Ametadoria Townsend, 1927
Aplomya Robineau-Desvoidy, 1830
Aplomyopsis Townsend, 1927
Bactromyia Brauer & Bergenstamm, 1891
Bactromyiella Mesnil, 1952
Buquetia Robineau-Desvoidy, 1847
Cadurciella Villeneuve, 1927
Carcelia Robineau-Desvoidy, 1830
Catagonia Brauer & von Bergenstamm, 1891
Cestonionerva Villeneuve, 1929
Diglossocera Wulp, 1895
Drino Robineau-Desvoidy, 1863
Epicampocera Macquart, 1849
Erycesta Herting, 1967
Erycia Robineau-Desvoidy, 1830
Euhygia Mesnil, 1968
Eunemorilla Townsend, 1919
Gymnophryxe Villeneuve, 1922
Hapalioloemus Baranov, 1934
Heliodorus Reinhard, 1964
Huebneria Robineau-Desvoidy, 1847
Isosturmia Townsend, 1927,
Lespesia Robineau-Desvoidy, 1863
Lydella Robineau-Desvoidy, 1830
Madremyia Townsend, 1916
Myothyriopsis Townsend, 1919
Nilea Robineau-Desvoidy, 1863
Paradrino Mesnil, 1949
Parapales Mesnil, 1950
Periarchiclops Villeneuve, 1924
Phebellia Robineau-Desvoidy, 1846
Phonomyia Brauer & von Bergenstamm, 1893
Phryxe Robineau-Desvoidy, 1830
Prooppia Townsend, 1926
Pseudoperichaeta Brauer & Bergenstamm, 1889
Rhinaplomyia Mesnil, 1955
Rhinomyodes Townsend, 1933
Senometopia Macquart, 1834
Setalunula Chao & Yang, 1990
Siphosturmia Coquillett, 1897
Sisyropa Brauer & Bergenstamm, 1889
Sturmiopsis Townsend, 1916
Thecocarcelia Townsend, 1933
Thelyconychia Brauer & von Bergenstamm, 1889
Thelymyia Brauer & von Bergenstamm, 1891
Tlephusa Robineau-Desvoidy, 1863
Townsendiellomyia Baranov, 1932
Tryphera Meigen, 1838
Tsugaea Hall, 1939
Weingaertneriella Baranov, 1932
Xylotachina Brauer & von Bergenstamm, 1891
Zizyphomyia Townsend, 1916
Tribe Exoristini
Atylomyia Brauer, 1898
Austrophorocera Townsend, 1916
Bessa Robineau-Desvoidy, 1863
Calliethilla Shima, 1979
Chaetexorista Brauer & Bergenstamm, 1895
Chetogena Rondani, 1856
Diplostichus Brauer & Bergenstamm, 1889
Ethilla Robineau-Desvoidy, 1863
Exorista Meigen, 1803
Gueriniopsis Reinhard, 1943
Gynandromyia Bezzi, 1923
Parasetigena Brauer & Bergenstamm, 1891
Paratryphera Brauer & von Bergenstamm, 1891
Phorcidella Mesnil, 1946
Phorocera Robineau-Desvoidy, 1830
Phorocerosoma Townsend, 1927
Tachinomyia Townsend, 1892
Tribe Goniini
Allophorocera Hendel, 1901
Aneogmena Brauer & von Bergenstamm, 1891
Arama Richter, 1972
Argyrophylax Brauer & von Bergenstamm, 1889
Asseclamyia Reinhard, 1956
Atacta Schiner, 1868
Atactopsis Townsend, 1917
Atractocerops Townsend, 1916
Baumhaueria Meigen, 1838
Belvosia Robineau-Desvoidy, 1830
Blepharella Macquart, 1851
Blepharipa Rondani, 1856
Bothria Rondani, 1856
Brachicheta Rondani, 1861
Cadurcia Villeneuve, 1926
Calozenillia Townsend, 1927
Carceliella Baranov, 1934
Ceratochaetops Mesnil, 1954
Ceromasia Rondani, 1856
Chaetocrania Townsend, 1915
Chaetogaedia Brauer & von Bergenstamm, 1891
Chaetoglossa Townsend, 1892
Chrysoexorista Townsend, 1915
Clemelis Robineau-Desvoidy, 1863
Crosskeya Shima & Chao, 1988
Cyzenis Robineau-Desvoidy, 1863
Distichona Wulp, 1890
Dolichocolon Brauer & von Bergenstamm, 1889
Eleodiphaga Walton, 1918
Elodia Robineau-Desvoidy, 1863
Erycilla Mesnil, 1957
Erynnia Robineau-Desvoidy, 1830
Erythrocera Robineau-Desvoidy, 1849
Euceromasia Townsend, 1912
Eucnephalia Townsend, 1892
Euexorista Townsend, 1912
Eumea Robineau-Desvoidy, 1863
Eumeella Mesnil, 1939
Eurysthaea Robineau-Desvoidy, 1863
Frontina Meigen, 1838
Frontiniella Townsend, 1918
Gaediopsis Brauer & von Bergenstamm, 1891
Gonia Meigen, 1803
Goniophthalmus Villeneuve, 1910
Hebia Robineau-Desvoidy, 1830
Hesperomyia Brauer & von Bergenstamm, 1889
Houghia Coquillett, 1897
Hypertrophomma Townsend, 1915
Hyphantrophaga Townsend, 1892
Isochaetina Mesnil, 1950
Kuwanimyia Townsend, 1916
Leschenaultia Robineau-Desvoidy, 1830
Masistylum Brauer & von Bergenstamm, 1893
Mystacella Wulp, 1890
Myxexoristops Townsend, 1911
Nealsomyia Mesnil, 1939
Ocytata Gistel, 1848
Onychogonia Brauer & von Bergenstamm, 1889
Oraphasmophaga Reinhard, 1958
Otomasicera Townsend, 1912
Pales Meigen, 1800
Palesisa Villeneuve, 1929
Paraphasmophaga Townsend, 1915
Paravibrissina Shima, 1979
Patelloa Townsend, 1916
Pexopsis Brauer & von Bergenstamm, 1889
Phryno Robineau-Desvoidy, 1830
Platymya Robineau-Desvoidy, 1830
Polygasropteryx Mesnil, 1953
Prosopea Rondani, 1861
Prosopodopsis Townsend, 1926
Prospherysa Wulp, 1890
Pseudalsomyia Mesnil, 1968
Pseudochaeta Coquillett, 1895
Pseudogonia Brauer & von Bergenstamm, 1889
Pujolina Mesnil, 1968
Scaphimyia Mesnil, 1955
Simoma Aldrich, 1926
Spallanzania Robineau-Desvoidy, 1830
Sturmia Robineau-Desvoidy, 1830
Suensonomyia Mesnil, 1953
Takanomyia Mesnil, 1957
Thelairodrino Mesnil, 1954
Thelymorpha Brauer & Bergenstamm, 1889
Torosomyia Reinhard, 1935
Tritaxys Macquart, 1847
Trixomorpha Brauer & von Bergenstamm, 1889
Zenillia Robineau-Desvoidy, 1830
Tribe Masiphyini
Masiphya Brauer & von Bergenstamm, 1891
Mystacomyia Giglio-Tos, 1893
Tribe Winthemiini
Chesippus Reinhard, 1967
Crypsina Brauer & von Bergenstamm, 1889
Diotrephes Reinhard, 1964
Hemisturmia Townsend, 1927
Nemorilla Rondani, 1856
Orasturmia Reinhard, 1947
Rhaphiochaeta Brauer & Bergenstamm, 1889
Smidtia Robineau-Desvoidy, 1830
Winthemia Robineau-Desvoidy, 1830

References

 
Diptera of Asia
Diptera of Africa
Muscomorph flies of Europe
Brachycera subfamilies
Tachinidae